Georgios Pavlakis (born 3 July 2003) is a Greek professional footballer who plays as a left-back for Super League 2 club Panathinaikos B.

References

2003 births
Living people
Super League Greece 2 players
Panathinaikos F.C. players
Association football defenders
Footballers from Athens
Greek footballers
Panathinaikos F.C. B players